Miroslav Nový (1 October 1930 – 30 May 1988) was a Czech ice hockey player who competed in the 1952 Winter Olympics.

References

External links

1930 births
1988 deaths
Ice hockey players at the 1952 Winter Olympics
Olympic ice hockey players of Czechoslovakia
Ice hockey people from Prague
Czech ice hockey defencemen
Czechoslovak ice hockey defencemen
Piráti Chomutov players